Mariam Dadiani may refer to:
Queens of Kartli
 Mariam (Tamar) Dadiani (died c. 1614), daughter of George III Dadiani, Prince of Samegrelo and wife of George X of Kartli
 Mariam Dadiani (1599/1609–1682), daughter of Manuchar I Dadiani, Prince of Samegrelo and wife of Simon I Gurieli, Prince of Guria, in 1621, King Rostom of Kartli in 1638, and the latter's adopted son and successor, King Vakhtang V of Kartli in 165
Queens of Imereti
 Mariam Dadiani (died before December 1732), daughter of Bezhan I Dadiani, Duke of Mingrelia and wife of Alexander V of Imereti
 Mariam Dadiani (died 1780), daughter of Otia Dadiani, Duke of Mingrelia and wife of Solomon I of Imereti
 Mariam Dadiani (died 1841), daughter of Katsia II Dadiani, Duke of Mingrelia and wife of Solomon II of Imereti

See also
Mariam of Georgia (disambiguation)